Les Monts d'Aunay is a commune in the department of Calvados, northwestern France. The municipality was established on 1 January 2017 by merger of the former communes of Aunay-sur-Odon (the seat), Bauquay, Campandré-Valcongrain, Danvou-la-Ferrière, Ondefontaine, Le Plessis-Grimoult and Roucamps.

Population

See also 
Communes of the Calvados department

References 

Montsdaunay